An amagat is a practical unit of volumetric number density. Although it can be applied to any substance at any conditions, it is defined as the number of ideal gas molecules per unit volume at 1 atm (101.325 kPa) and 0 °C (273.15 K). It is named after Émile Amagat, who also has Amagat's law named after him.  The abbreviated form of amagat is "amg".  The abbreviation "Am" has also been used.

SI Conversion 
The amg unit for number density can be converted to the SI unit mol/m3 by the formula:

where ≘ indicates correspondence, since the SI unit is of molar concentration and not number density.
The conversion factor (44.615...) is called the Loschmidt number .

The number density of an ideal gas at pressure p and temperature T can be calculated as 
,
where T0 = 273.15 K and p0 = 101.325 kPa (STP before 1982).

Example
Number density of an ideal gas (such as air) at room temperature (20 °C) and 1 atm (101.325 kPa) is

References

Amount of substance
Units of density
Physical chemistry